Wellesbourne Mountford Airfield (ICAO:EGBW) is located in Wellesbourne, Warwickshire, England,  east of Stratford-upon-Avon. The airfield was formerly the Royal Air Force station RAF Wellesbourne Mountford.

Wellesbourne Mountford is best known for its role in the Second World War, when it was under control by RAF Bomber Command as an Operational Training Unit training crews from within the commonwealth and other countries.

Today the airfield has a CAA Ordinary Licence (Number P681) that allows flights for the public transport of passengers or for flying instruction as authorised by the licensee (Radarmoor Limited). It is primarily a general aviation (GA) airfield; see UKGA for details. Wellesbourne Mountford is also home to Avro Vulcan XM655, which is kept in taxiable condition.

History of the airfield

Royal Air Force use

The airfield was originally opened in 1941 constructed in the typical Class A airfield design, the main unit to use the airfield was No. 22 Operational Training Unit RAF which flew Vickers Wellingtons and Avro Ansons for RAF Bomber Command from 14 April 1941.

During the Second World War the airfield was attacked a few times by enemy bombers on their way home after bombing targets in the Midlands such as Coventry and Birmingham. The nearby Ettington railway station was used to transport troops and munitions from the rest of the country then to the airfield using RAF lorries and buses. Crews also attacked a number of German cities such as Cologne, Essen and Bremen as part of the 1,000 bomber raids. The aircraft were crewed by instructors and students with some planes unfortunately failing to return.

The airfield was briefly home to the No. 3 Glider Training School which started using Wellesbourne Mountford during July 1945 preparing for war in the far east using the General Aircraft Hotspur before being disbanded on 3 December 1947, the RAF School of Photography from 1948 to 1964, the RAF School of Education 1950 to 1952 and the Airfield Construction Branch from 1951 to 1964. In 1964 the airfield was closed and put on a care and maintenance basis then returned to the original owners.

Civilian use

The airfield has been reduced in size following the closure of the RAF station with a large number of the pan dispersals and dispersal track being removed in the 1970s for civilian construction projects and with the removal of one runway (which is now a concrete taxiway) and the shortened length of another. In the past, Wellesbourne was temporarily home to Air Atlantique Douglas DC-3s between 1965 and 1981 also the site was used for vehicle testing by the Rootes Group, Coventry and a number of different groups occupied the site for uses like microlighting.

Current use

Today the airfield has a CAA Ordinary Licence (Number P681) that allows flights for the public transport of passengers or for flying instruction as authorised by the licensee (Radarmoor Limited).

Wellesbourne Mountford also has an annual wings and wheels event where military and classic cars meet with various aircraft including the in-house Avro Vulcan bomber XM655.

The airfield holds a large market held on Saturdays and Bank Holidays on the eastern side. The airfield also has a café and a number of flying schools located near to the control tower.

The airfield is currently under threat from developers who want to build 1,600 homes on the site.

Accidents and incidents

In 2010 a small plane crashed on the A429 near to the airfield. The aeroplane was doing circuits around the airfield.

On Tuesday 6 August 2013 a two-seater Van's Aircraft RV-9 diesel powered aircraft suffered an engine failure shortly after takeoff. The pilot executed a forced landing into a nearby field (near Loxley) which resulted in the aircraft smashing through a hedgerow and inverting. The pilot, who was 59 and had 10 years flying experience, was trapped for 40 minutes whilst emergency services tried to locate the crash site. The pilot escaped with just a "bloody thumb".

On Friday 16 September 2022, XM655 (piloted by Wg Cdr Mike Pollitt) suffered a runway excursion when performing a ground run as practice for the following Sunday's public show. This was due to a faulty air speed indicator, which resulted in the aircraft remaining at full power for approximately 2 seconds longer than intended. This resulted in excessive speed and less distance in which to stop, and the aircraft passed beyond the end of the runway – stopping just before the airfield perimeter which borders the B4086. The air speed indicator had been tested and found satisfactory six days before the incident, which had started to work normally before the end of the run. The aircraft's brakes worked properly but were unable to bring the aircraft to a stop with the reduced space available.

Wellesbourne Wartime Museum

The airfield is also home to the Wellesbourne Wartime Museum situated at the end of the car park near to the control tower which includes the Avro Vulcan XM655 which is located separately in the northwest corner of the airfield and maintained by the 655 Maintenance & Preservation Society.

Current museum exhibits

Fixed-base Operators 

 Aeros Flight Training
 Heli Air
 On-Track Aviation
 South Warwickshire Flying School

References

Citations

Bibliography

External links

The Wartime Memories Project
RAF Airfield Construction Branch
BBC History – Wellesbourne Mountford Part 1
BBC History – Wellesbourne Mountford Part 2
English Heritage – Pastscape
Wellesbourne Wartime Museum guide
Wellesbourne Wartime Museum leaflet
 655 Maintenance and Preservation Society (655MaPS)

Airports in England
Transport in Warwickshire
Airports in the West Midlands (region)